Museo de Arte Precolombino (Spanish) or Pre-Columbian Art Museum (English) forms the name or part of the name of several specific institutions devoted to collections of pre-Columbian art and artefacts. As such, either of these may refer to:
Museo de Arte Precolombino (Peru), art museum containing collections of Peruvian pre-Columbian artworks, located in Cusco, Peru
Museo Chileno de Arte Precolombino, pre-Columbian art museum located in Santiago, Chile
Museu Barbier-Mueller d'Art Precolombí, pre-Columbian art museum located in Barcelona, Spain
Museo Vigua de Arte Precolombino y Vidrio Moderno (Vigua Museum of pre-Columbian Art and Modern Glass), in Antigua Guatemala, Guatemala
Dumbarton Oaks Research Library and Collection, in Washington DC, has a museum of artefacts commonly known as the "Pre-Columbian Art Museum"

See also
:Category:Pre-Columbian art museums, for museums exhibiting pre-Columbian art and artefacts, in general